is a skyscraper in the Shiodome area of Minato, Tokyo, Japan managed by Mitsui Fudosan and Alderney Investments Pte Ltd., a subsidiary of the Singaporean sovereign wealth fund GIC Private Limited.

Fujitsu's worldwide headquarters are in Shiodome City Center. The airline All Nippon Airways maintains its headquarters and a ticketing office at the building. The subsidiaries Air Nippon, ANA & JP Express, and All Nippon Airways Trading are headquartered in the building. Air Japan, an ANA subsidiary, has some offices in Shiodome City Center. Mitsui Chemicals has its headquarters in Shiodome City Center. Vanilla Air, when it was known as AirAsia Japan, was headquartered here.

The building which opened in 2003, has a 1200% floor area ratio.

History
In 2002 All Nippon Airways (ANA) announced that it would be taking up to 10 floors in the then under-construction Shiodome City Center. It was planning on moving its headquarters from Tokyo International Airport. ANA announced that it was also moving some subsidiaries to the Shiodome City Center. When Shiodome City Center opened, Nippon Cargo Airlines moved its headquarters into the facility. The airline had its headquarters and its East Japan sales office on the 8th floor.

Retail tenants

 Aigan
 Famima!! 
Godiva Chocolatier
 Libro
Porsche Center Ginza
 Subway
 Tomod's
 Vie de France

Transportation
The building is in close proximity to the Shimbashi Station and the Shiodome Station.

References

External links

Shiodome City Center Retail
Shiodome City Center Official Website (Japanese)
Shiodome City Center Retail (Japanese)
Shiodome City Center - Emporis

Skyscraper office buildings in Tokyo
All Nippon Airways
Fujitsu
Shiodome
Buildings and structures in Minato, Tokyo
Airline headquarters
Underground cities
Mitsui Fudosan
Retail buildings in Tokyo
Office buildings completed in 2003
2003 establishments in Japan
Corporate headquarters